I-140 may refer to:
Interstate 140 (North Carolina), a bypass of Wilmington, North Carolina
Interstate 140 (Tennessee), a spur route in Knoxville, Tennessee
 Form I-140, Immigrant Petition for Alien Worker, a form that needs to be filed as part of the application process for an employment-based visa for the United States
Iodine-140 (I-140 or 140I), an isotope of iodine